Guy Boyd (born April 15, 1943) is an American character actor. Boyd has starred in more than fifty films from the late 1970s to the present. He is probably best known for his role as Detective Jim McLean in Body Double (1984) and for the pivotal role of Frank Hackman on two episodes of Miami Vice.

In 1984, he was honored at the Venice Film Festival with the Golden Lion Award for Best Supporting Actor for his role in Robert Altman's adaptation of David Rabe's play Streamers (1983). In recent years Boyd was seen playing Captain Strickland on the science fiction television show Black Scorpion. He played Archbishop Kurtwell (a Catholic prelate accused of child sexual abuse) in the HBO drama The Young Pope. He also starred in Past Midnight as Guy Canape.

Awards
Nominated, 3rd Genie Awards, "Best Performance by a Foreign Actor" for role in film Ticket to Heaven

Filmography
 1977 Between the Lines as Austin
 1981 Ticket to Heaven as Eric
 1981 Only When I Laugh as Man In Bar
 1981 Ghost Story as Omar Norris
 1983 The Eyes of the Amaryllis as George Reade
 1983 Streamers as Rooney
 1983 Eyes of Fire as Marion Dalton
 1984 Newhart (Episode: "Book Beat") as Colonel Lloyd Meninger
 1984 Tank as Sergeant Wimofsky
 1984 Flashpoint as Bobby Joe Lambasino
 1984 Body Double as Jim McLean
 1984 Caravan of Courage: An Ewok Adventure (TV Movie) as Jeremitt Towani
 1985 Jagged Edge as Matthew Barnes
 1985 Target as Clay
 1986 Lucas as Coach
 1987 No Man's Land as "Jaws"
 1986-1988 Miami Vice (TV Series) as Frank Hackman
 1988 War Party as Major Crawford, National Guard
 1988 The Dark Side of the Sun as Father
 1989 Little Sweetheart as Sheriff
 1990 The Last of the Finest as R.J. Norringer
 1990 Pacific Heights as Warning Cop
 1991 Kiss Me a Killer as Jake Bozman
 1991 Checkered Flag as J.D. Nelson
 1991 Past Midnight as Todd Canipe
 1991 The Dark Wind as Agent Johnson
 1992 Sister Act as Detective Tate (uncredited)
 1993 Mi Vida Loca as Priest
 1994 In the Heat of Passion II: Unfaithful as Brannigan
 1995 Carnosaur 2 as Joe Walker
 1996 Sister Island as Sheriff Frank Bosarge
 1997 Retroactive as Bud
 1998 Crossfire as Mr. Ross
 1999 Balloon Farm (TV Movie) as The Mayor
 2000-2005 Law & Order (TV Series) as Elston Norrell / Mr. Beltran
 2001 Black Scorpion (TV Series) as Captain Henry Strickland
 2005 Domino One as Jack Mekas
 2005 Winter Passing as Hunter
 2005 The Final Patient as Sheriff McKnee
 2006 Walker Payne as "Doc"
 2007 Blackbird as The Landlord
 2007 The Savages as Bill Lachman
 2010 Henry's Crime as Bernie
 2014 Foxcatcher as Henry Beck
 2014 While We're Young as Bar Patron
 2016 Certain Women as Personal Injury Lawyer
 2019 The Report as Senator Saxby Chambliss
 2019 The Loudest Voice (TV Mini-Series) as Chet Collier
 2020 I'm Thinking of Ending Things as The Janitor

References

External links

1943 births
Living people
American male film actors
Male actors from Chicago
Volpi Cup for Best Actor winners